The Phoenician arrowheads or Phoenician javelin heads are a well-known group of almost 70 Phoenician inscribed bronze arrowheads from the 11th century BC onwards.

The first known inscription was the Ruweiseh arrowhead; it is the only one found in situ. The other arrowheads are of unknown origin, having first appeared on the antiquities markets.

The inscriptions are thought to be personal names.

They are known as KAI 20–22.

Because of their early date, the arrowheads are important in the modern understanding of the history of the Phoenician language; in particular, the 1953 discovery of the three al-Khader arrowheads is said to have "initiated a new stage in the study of alphabetic origins". It has become conventional to refer to the written script as "Proto-Canaanite" until the mid-11th century BC, the point at which "Phoenician" is first attested on the arrowheads. Frank Moore Cross and Józef Milik wrote in 1954 that "[t]he el-Khadr javelin-heads provide the missing link between the latest of the Proto-Canaanite epigraphs, and the earliest of the Phoenician inscriptions".

Ruweiseh arrowhead

The Ruweiseh arrowhead was the first discovered in modern times, and still the only one found in archaeological context. It was found at Roueisseh, near Nabatieh Fawka ("Upper Nabatieh), by Pierre Giugues during an archaeological survey of necropolises in the area. Two arrowheads were discovered in the same tomb, but the second had no inscription. The tomb had been reused into the Hellenistic period, such that the contents of the tombs were overturned, making any stratigraphic study impossible.

The arrowhead was dated based on its paleographic style, with scholars concluding that it was probably produced during the 10th century BCE

The inscription states: "arrow of Addo, son of Akki".

It is currently in the Louvre.

Al-Khader arrowheads
The next set of arrowheads (described as javelin heads) were published in 1954; three inscribed arrowheads were purchased separately on the antiquities market in 1953–54, by Gerald Lankester Harding, Frank Moore Cross and Józef Milik. They were later ascertained to have been part of a hoard of 26 javelin and arrowheads (mostly uninscribed) found by a fellah from al-Khader, just west of Bethlehem.

Given their age, these three artifacts are considered perhaps the most significant in the known corpus. They used vertical and left-to-right letters, representing a transitional stage between early Iron Age Phoenician scripts and the prior proto-Canaanite inscriptions. Cross and Milik wrote in 1954: "As there is no evidence for the occupation of the site earlier than the Roman period, the cache may have been lost or buried with its owner, during or after a battle."

The name mentioned in the three inscriptions is almost exactly the same, ˁbdlb(ˀ)t. Surprisingly, this same name appears on the Ruweiseh arrowhead. Cross and Milik wrote that “if it is not pure coincidence, this may be an indication that a hereditary and/or mercenary archer class existed."

List

References

Citations

Bibliography 
 
  Wolfgang Röllig, Onomastic and Palaeographic considerations on Early Phoenician Arrow-Heads.” In Actes du IIIe Congrès international des études phéniciennes et punique, Tunis, 11–16 novembre 1991, Vol. II (1995), S. 348–355

Further reading
 
 
 

1926 archaeological discoveries
Phoenician inscriptions
Archaeological artifacts
KAI inscriptions
Archaeology of Lebanon
Ancient weapons
Bronze objects
Ancient art in metal